SHAW: The Annual of Bernard Shaw Studies is an academic journal devoted to the works and life of George Bernard Shaw. The journal is published annually by the Penn State University Press. The journal formerly went by the names Bulletin (Shaw Society of America) (1951–1958) and The Shaw Review (1959–1980).

External links 
Official website
SHAW at Project MUSE

English-language journals
Penn State University Press academic journals
Publications established in 1951
Literary magazines published in the United States
Annual journals
Shaw, Bernard
George Bernard Shaw